Rhacodactylus leachianus, commonly known as the New Caledonian giant gecko, Leach's giant gecko, Leachianus Gecko, or simply Leachie, is a large species of gecko in the family Diplodactylidae. The species, which was first described by Georges Cuvier in 1829,  is endemic to New Caledonia.

Taxonomy
The specific name, leachianus, is in honor of English zoologist William Elford Leach. Historically, there have been three recognized subspecies of R. leachianus (including the nominotypical subspecies): R. l. aubrianus, R. l. henkeli (first described by Seipp and Obst in 1994), and R. l. leachianus. However, based on recent molecular data, no populations of R. leachianus are granted subspecies status at the present time.

Description

R. leachianus is the largest extant gecko in the world and is considered an example of island gigantism. R. l. leachianus, of the Grande Terre locality, is capable of growing 14-17″ (36-43cm) long, while R. l. henkeli, or the Isle of Pines locality, is capable of growing 9-12" (23-30cm) long. It has a heavy body, loose skin, and a small, stumpy tail. It is variable in color, coming in shades of mottled green, gray, and brown, sometimes with highlights of white, orange, and/or pink.

Distribution and habitat
R. leachianus is found in all of the southern and eastern portions of the main island of New Caledonia, as well as on several of the smaller islands in the group. The insular locality of Duu Ana is thought to no longer have an extant population of R. Leachianus.

Biology
R. leachianus is an arboreal species, living in trees. It is nocturnally active, but may bask in the morning sun. It eats a diet of insects, spiders, small vertebrates, fruit, nectar, and sap. Adult females of R. leachianus lay two eggs at a time, having up to 10 clutches per year. R. leachianus can make a loud growling noise, and local people call it "the devil in the trees".

Like many chameleons, New Caledonian Geckos can change the color of their skin. This is due to pigment containing cells called chromatophores. Depending on the amount of sunlight, their skin may be lighter or darker. This is a form of camouflage and can help the gecko blend into their environments. These giant geckos also can climb vertically up glass surfaces. This is due to adhesive pads on their feet called lamellas, which are made up of tiny hairs which increase friction force when applied to surfaces.

Folklore
Some of the indigenous Kanak people of New Caledonia fear Leach's giant gecko. This is because of an old superstition which purports that it has the ability to cling to a person's body and pull out that person's soul.

Conservation status
Populations of the species R. leachianus have likely been reduced by habitat destruction and degradation. This process is still a threat to the species. It also faces predation by introduced species such as cats and various rodents. It is also poached. It can be electrocuted when it travels along power lines. This species is protected and it lives in several nature reserves.

In captivity
The New Caledonian giant gecko is occasionally kept as a pet. Individuals in the pet trade are propagated with captive breeding; wild populations are protected. This species may live over 20 years in captivity, with some individuals reaching up to 50 years old.

References 

Rhacodactylus
Geckos of New Caledonia
Reptiles described in 1829
Taxa named by Georges Cuvier